Portis is a city in Osborne County, Kansas, United States.  As of the 2020 census, the population of the city was 86.

History
The first settlement at Portis was made in 1871. In that year a trading post was established at the site.

In 1879, the town was platted with the name of Bethany.  The Central Branch Railroad routed through the city and built a station.  Later, the railroad was sold to the Missouri Pacific Railroad, it became the second "Bethany" on their railroad system.  To prevent conflicts with Bethany, Missouri, it was decided to change the name of this station.  The name was changed to Portis, in honor of the Vice-President of the Missouri Pacific, Thomas Jefferson Portis (born in 1827).

Geography
Portis is located at  (39.562813, -98.691408).

Portis is located on the north fork of the Solomon River.

Demographics

2010 census
As of the census of 2010, there were 103 people, 50 households, and 29 families residing in the city. The racial makeup of the city was 99.0% White and 1.0% from two or more races.

There were 50 households, of which 22.0% had children under the age of 18 living with them, 50.0% were married couples living together, 6.0% had a female householder with no husband present, 2.0% had a male householder with no wife present, and 42.0% were non-families. 40.0% of all households were made up of individuals, and 22% had someone living alone who was 65 years of age or older. The average household size was 2.06 and the average family size was 2.76.

The median age in the city was 46.5 years. 22.3% of residents were under the age of 18; 7.8% were between the ages of 18 and 24; 17.5% were from 25 to 44; 30% were from 45 to 64; and 22.3% were 65 years of age or older. The gender makeup of the city was 51.5% male and 48.5% female.

2000 census
As of the census of 2000, there were 123 people, 58 households, and 33 families residing in the city. The racial makeup of the city was 96.75% White, 0.81% Asian, and 2.44% from two or more races. Hispanic or Latino of any race were 0.81% of the population.

There were 58 households, out of which 20.7% had children under the age of 18 living with them, 53.4% were married couples living together, 3.4% had a female householder with no husband present, and 43.1% were non-families. 39.7% of all households were made up of individuals, and 19.0% had someone living alone who was 65 years of age or older. The average household size was 2.12 and the average family size was 2.91.

In the city, the population was spread out, with 24.4% under the age of 18, 1.6% from 18 to 24, 24.4% from 25 to 44, 23.6% from 45 to 64, and 26.0% who were 65 years of age or older. The median age was 45 years. For every 100 females, there were 101.6 males. For every 100 females age 18 and over, there were 106.7 males.

The median income for a household in the city was $25,000, and the median income for a family was $28,333. Males had a median income of $25,000 versus $17,500 for females. The per capita income for the city was $23,653. There were 3.6% of families and 6.6% of the population living below the poverty line, including no under eighteens and 13.6% of those over 64.

Education
Portis is a part of USD 392 Osborne County Schools.

Portis High School was closed through school unification. The Portis High School mascot was Portis Tigers.

In popular culture
A memorial was put up in this small city in honor of Melvin "Tubby" Millar.  Millar was a storyman for Leon Schlesinger Productions, which produced Looney Tunes and Merrie Melodies..  The Millar Memorial reads: "In memory of Melvin Tubby Millar, animator for Looney Tunes Porky Pig cartoons and assistant to Friz Freleng, creator of Porky Pig."  Millar included his hometown name into many of his cartoon episodes, including:

1) In "Porky's Pet" (King, 1936) the train station has a poster in the background reading "When in Portis, Stop at Millar Manor".

2) In "Bingo Crosbyana" (Freleng, 1936) there is a matchbox with the name "Portis Matches" and a wine glass with the label saying "90 Percent Portis".

3) A crate in the episode "Porky of the North Woods" (Tashlin, 1936) reads "#2 Portis Kan".  It is apparent by the label that the word "Kansas" did not get finished, thus ending with just "Kan" and half of an 'S'.

References

Further reading

External links
 Portis - Directory of Public Officials
 USD 392, local school district
 Historic Images - Wichita State University Libraries
 Portis history
 Portis city map, KDOT

Cities in Osborne County, Kansas
Cities in Kansas